James Quarles may refer to:

James Minor Quarles (1823–1901), politician from Tennessee
James Thomas Quarles (1877–1954), organist and educator
James L. Quarles (born 1946), American lawyer and member of Watergate Special Prosecution Force